Harold Walker (12 June 1918 – 12 November 2000) was an English cricketer.  Walker was a right-handed batsman who bowled right-arm medium pace.  He was born at Desborough, Northamptonshire.

Walker made his only first-class appearance for Northamptonshire against Essex in 1947.  He opened the batting in this match, scoring a single run before being dismissed by Bill Dines, while in their second-innings he scored 7 runs, before being dismissed by the same bowler.

He died at Kettering, Northamptonshire on 12 November 2000.

References

External links
Harold Walker at ESPNcricinfo
Harold Walker at CricketArchive

1918 births
2000 deaths
People from Desborough
English cricketers
Northamptonshire cricketers